The Diwan Abatur ("Scroll of Abatur") is a Mandaean religious text. It is a large illustrated scroll that is over 20 ft. long.

A similar illustrated Mandaean scroll is the Diwan Nahrawata ("The Scroll of the Rivers"), a lavishly illustrated geographical treatise which translated into German and published by Kurt Rudolph in 1982.

Contents
The Diwan Abatur mentions a heavenly tree called Shatrin (Šatrin) where the souls of unbaptized Mandaean children are temporarily nourished for 30 days. On the 30th day, Hibil Ziwa baptizes the souls of the children, who then continue on to the World of Light. The tree has a length of 360,000 parasangs according to the Diwan Abatur.

Additionally, the Diwan Abatur mentions a ship called Shahrat (Šahrat; lit. "she kept watch") that ferries souls from Tibil across the Hitpun and into the house of Abatur.

Manuscripts and translations
An English translation of the text was published by E. S. Drower in 1950, which was based on manuscript 8 of the Drower Collection (abbreviated DC 8).

A manuscript of the Diwan Abatur, MS. Borgiani Siriaci 175 (abbreviated BS175), is held at the Biblioteca Apostolica Vaticana in Vatican City.

In 2020, Bogdan Burtea translated the Diwan Abatur into German.

Gallery

See also
The Thousand and Twelve Questions
Scroll of Exalted Kingship
Anubis

References

External links
Diwan Abathur (Mandaic text from the Mandaean Network)
Diwan Abathur (Mandaic text from the Mandaean Network)

Mandaean texts